Built in murus dacicus style, the six Dacian Fortresses of the Orăștie Mountains, in Romania, were created in the 1st centuries BC and AD as protection against Roman conquest, and played an important role during the Roman-Dacian wars.

Their extensive and well-preserved remains present a  picture of a vigorous and innovative ancient civilization. Today, treasure-hunters sometimes search the area, as Romania lacks legislation in this domain.

The six fortresses - Sarmizegetusa Regia, Costeşti-Cetăţuie, Costeşti-Blidaru, Piatra Roşie, Bănița and Căpâlna - that formed the defensive system of Decebalus were designated as a UNESCO World Heritage Site in 1999. All the sites are in Hunedoara County, except for Căpâlna, which is in Alba County.

Sarmizegetusa Regia

The town of Sarmizegetusa Regia was the capital and major fortress of the Dacian kingdom, probably built in the mid first century BCE. It consisted of perimeter walls and fortifications, a sacred precinct, and a settlement area primarily for nobles and supporting servants. It was located at the top of a 1200-meter hill with excellent visibility of the surrounding lands. The sacred precinct was on the east side of the town, with a prominent plaza and circular shrines. There were two settlement areas one on the east side and a larger one on the west. In addition to dwellings they included workshops, storage buildings, and agricultural processing areas. Notable for the time is a distribution system for drinking water that used ceramic pipes.

Costești-Cetățuie

Costești-Blidaru

Piatra Roșie

Piatra Roșie, which means Red Rock, was a Dacian hill fort two days march to the west from Costești-Cetățuie, at Luncani in Boşorod municipality.  It was built in two phases.  In the first phase a long (102 m) rectangular main citadel was built at the height of land with watch towers on each end and two outlying watch towers. Later the larger area inside the watch towers was enclosed with walls. It appears that the hilltop was flattened in the process in order to produce a usable space.

Gallery

See also
Burebista
List of Dacian towns
Murus dacicus
Sarmizegetusa Regia
List of World Heritage Sites in Romania 
Seven Wonders of Romania

Notes

Further reading

UNESCO

External links

UNESCO: The Dacian Fortresses of the Orastie Mountains
Regional portal with locations and information related to the six Dacian Fortresses of the Orăștie Mountains 
Virtual 3D reconstruction of the Dacian fortresses

Archaeological sites in Romania
World Heritage Sites in Romania
Dacian fortresses in Hunedoara County
Dacian fortresses in Alba County
 
Buildings and structures in Hunedoara County
Buildings and structures in Alba County
Ancient history of Transylvania